The Women's Central American Volleyball Championship is the official competition for senior women's national volleyball teams of Central America and the Caribbean, organized by the Central American Volleyball Confederation (AFECAVOL). Since its introduction in 1974 the tournaments have been awarded every two years. The competition has been dominated Entirely by Costa Rica with 18 Titles then came Panama with two titles Finally we find the Honduras along with Nicaragua with one title each.

History

Medals Summary

See also

 NORCECA Men's Volleyball Championship
 Women's Junior NORCECA Volleyball Championship
 Girls' Youth NORCECA Volleyball Championship
 Volleyball at the Pan American Games
 Women's Pan-American Volleyball Cup
 Volleyball at the Central American and Caribbean Games

References

External links
 AFECAVOL
 Todor 66 Central America Championship

Recurring sporting events established in 1974
Volleyball in Central America
Volleyball in the Caribbean
International volleyball competitions
International women's volleyball competitions
Biennial sporting events